Salvador Valeri i Pupurull (1873–1954) was a Catalan architect who worked in the style of Modernisme.

Valeri was born in Barcelona and studied in the Polytechnical School of Madrid and the School of Architecture of Barcelona, where he obtained the degree of architect in 1899.

See also 
 Modernisme
 Art Nouveau
 Barcelona

External links 
 Website about the architect

Architects from Catalonia
Polytechnic University of Madrid alumni
1873 births
1954 deaths
Modernisme architects